The Einstein radius is the radius of an Einstein ring, and is a characteristic angle for gravitational lensing in general, as typical distances between images in gravitational lensing are of the order of the Einstein radius.

Derivation 

In the following derivation of the Einstein radius, we will assume that all of mass M of the lensing galaxy L is concentrated in the center of the galaxy.

For a point mass the deflection can be calculated and is one of the classical tests of general relativity. For small angles α1 the total deflection by a point mass M is given (see Schwarzschild metric) by

where
 b1 is the impact parameter (the distance of nearest approach of the lightbeam to the center of mass)
 G is the gravitational constant,
 c is the speed of light.

 ..... (Eqn. 1)

This gives the lens equation

which can be rearranged to give
 ..... (Eqn. 2)

By setting (eq. 1) equal to (eq. 2), and rearranging, we get

For a source right behind the lens, the lens equation for a point mass gives a characteristic value for θ1 that is called the Einstein angle, denoted θE. When θE is expressed in radians, and the lensing source is sufficiently far away, the Einstein Radius, denoted RE, is given by 
.

Putting  and solving for θ1 gives

The Einstein angle for a point mass provides a convenient linear scale to make dimensionless lensing variables. In terms of the Einstein angle, the lens equation for a point mass becomes

Substituting for the constants gives

In the latter form, the mass is expressed in solar masses ( and the distances in Gigaparsec (Gpc). The Einstein radius is most prominent for a lens typically halfway between the source and the observer.

For a dense cluster with mass  at a distance of 1 Gigaparsec (1 Gpc) this radius could be as large as 100 arcsec (called macrolensing). For a Gravitational microlensing event (with masses of order ) search for at galactic distances (say ), the typical Einstein radius would be of order milli-arcseconds. Consequently, separate images in microlensing events are impossible to observe with current techniques.

Likewise, for the lower ray of light reaching the observer from below the lens, we have

and 

and thus

The argument above can be extended for lenses which have a distributed mass, rather than a point mass, by using a different expression for the bend angle α the positions θI(θS) of the images can then be calculated. For small deflections this mapping is one-to-one and consists of distortions of the observed positions which are invertible. This is called weak lensing. For large deflections one can have multiple images and a non-invertible mapping: this is called strong lensing. Note that in order for a distributed mass to result in an Einstein ring, it must be axially symmetric.

See also 
 Gravitational lens
 Einstein ring

References

Bibliography 
  (The first paper to propose rings)
  (The famous Einstein Ring paper)
 

Radius
Gravitational lensing